The Château de Valognes was a castle in Valognes, Manche, France.

A castle has existed at Valognes since the 11th century. Bertrand du Guesclin captured it in 1364 and 1374 from the English garrisons. The castle was destroyed under orders of King Louis XIV of France in 1689, leaving only a small tower, which was destroyed by bombing in 1944.

References
Stéphane William Gondoin. Les châteaux forts au temps de Guillaume le Conquérant. September 2015
 G. Le Barbanchon. Le château de Valognes et ses origines in: Revue de la Manche, tome I, fasc. 2, April 1959

Castles in Manche
Former castles in France